Gov. Lloyd Crow Stark House and Carriage House, also known as the Stark Mansion, is a historic home located at Louisiana, Pike County, Missouri. It was built in 1891, and is a two-story, Stick / Eastlake movement style brick mansion.  It features three two-story bays on the primary facade, and centered, one-story bays on the side elevations, with gable roofs, fishscale shingles, and a decorative front porch.  Also on the property is a contributing carriage house.  This was the home of Missouri Governor Lloyd Crow Stark from 1915 to 1940.

It was listed on the National Register of Historic Places in 1987.

References

Houses on the National Register of Historic Places in Missouri
Queen Anne architecture in Missouri
Houses completed in 1891
Buildings and structures in Pike County, Missouri
National Register of Historic Places in Pike County, Missouri